{{DISPLAYTITLE:C62H111N11O12}}
The molecular formula C62H111N11O12 (molar mass: 1202.611 g/mol, exact mass: 1201.841 u) may refer to:

 Ciclosporin
 NIM811

Molecular formulas